Magnetostatics is the study of magnetic fields in systems where the currents are steady (not changing with time). It is the magnetic analogue of electrostatics, where the charges are stationary. The magnetization need not be static; the equations of magnetostatics can be used to predict fast magnetic switching events that occur on time scales of nanoseconds or less. Magnetostatics is even a good approximation when the currents are not static – as long as the currents do not alternate rapidly. Magnetostatics is widely used in applications of micromagnetics such as models of magnetic storage devices as in computer memory.

Applications

Magnetostatics as a special case of Maxwell's equations
Starting from Maxwell's equations and assuming that charges are either fixed or move as a steady current , the equations separate into two equations for the electric field (see electrostatics) and two for the magnetic field. The fields are independent of time and each other. The magnetostatic equations, in both differential and integral forms, are shown in the table below.

Where ∇ with the dot denotes divergence, and B is the magnetic flux density, the first integral is over a surface  with oriented surface element .

The quality of this approximation may be guessed by comparing the above equations with the full version of Maxwell's equations and considering the importance of the terms that have been removed. Of particular significance is the comparison of the  term against the  term. If the  term is substantially larger, then the smaller term may be ignored without significant loss of accuracy.

Re-introducing Faraday's law
A common technique is to solve a series of magnetostatic problems at incremental time steps and then use these solutions to approximate the term . This method is not a true solution of Maxwell's equations but can provide a good approximation for slowly changing fields.

Solving for the magnetic field

Current sources
If all currents in a system are known (i.e., if a complete description of the current density  is available) then the magnetic field can be determined, at a position r, from the currents by the Biot–Savart equation:

This technique works well for problems where the medium is a vacuum or air or some similar material with a relative permeability of 1. This includes air-core inductors and air-core transformers. One advantage of this technique is that, if a coil has a complex geometry, it can be divided into sections and the integral evaluated for each section. Since this equation is primarily used to solve linear problems, the contributions can be added. For a very difficult geometry, numerical integration may be used.

For problems where the dominant magnetic material is a highly permeable magnetic core with relatively small air gaps, a magnetic circuit approach is useful. When the air gaps are large in comparison to the magnetic circuit length, fringing becomes significant and usually requires a finite element calculation. The finite element calculation uses a modified form of the magnetostatic equations above in order to calculate magnetic potential. The value of  can be found from the magnetic potential.

The magnetic field can be derived from the vector potential. Since the divergence of the magnetic flux density is always zero,

and the relation of the vector potential to current is:

Magnetization

Strongly magnetic materials (i.e., ferromagnetic, ferrimagnetic or paramagnetic) have a magnetization that is primarily due to electron spin. In such materials the magnetization must be explicitly included using the relation

Except in the case of conductors, electric currents can be ignored. Then Ampère's law is simply

This has the general solution

where  is a scalar potential. Substituting this in Gauss's law gives

Thus, the divergence of the magnetization,  has a role analogous to the electric charge in electrostatics and is often referred to as an effective charge density .

The vector potential method can also be employed with an effective current density

See also
 Darwin Lagrangian

References

External links

 
Electric and magnetic fields in matter
Potentials